Gulabsinh Pirabhai Rajput is a member of the Gujarat Legislative Assembly representing the Tharad constituency. He is a member of the Indian National Congress party. He was first elected as the MLA for Tharad in 2019. He was State President of Gujarat Youth Congress a part of Indian Youth Congress youth wing of Indian National Congress.

References

Year of birth missing (living people)
Living people
Gujarat MLAs 2017–2022
Indian National Congress politicians from Gujarat

External links